This is a list of rosters of the UCI Continental team Team TreFor–Blue Water, categorised by season.

2016 
Roster in 2016, age as of 1 January 2016:

2015

2012 
Roster in 2012, age as of 1 January 2012:

2011 
Roster in 2011, age as of 1 January 2011:

References

Team TreFor-Blue Water rosters